Tolu-e-Islam may refer to:
Tulu'i Islam a poem, written by Muhammad Iqbal.
Tolu-e-Islam (magazine)
Tolu-e-Islam (organization)